This article is a catalog of actresses and models who have appeared on the cover of Harper's Bazaar India, the Indian edition of Harper's Bazaar magazine, starting with the magazine's first issue in March 2009.

2009

2010

2011

2012

2013

2014

2015

2016

2017

2018

2019

2020

2021

2022

References

External links
 Hottest Covers of Harpers Bazaar (2009-12) - India Today

India
Harper's Bazaar India
Harper's Bazaar India
Hearst Communications publications
Lists of 21st-century people